Dames in de Dop 1 is the first season of Dames in de Dop, began on May 28, 2007. The winner, won €20,000 and a luxurious vacation.

Contestants

In order of elimination
Jasmin Velders, 21, from Hook of Holland, South Holland
Kirby Wonnink, 20, from Deventer, Overijssel
Tamara Brun, 25, from Rotterdam, South Holland
Roxanne Brouwers, 18, from 's-Hertogenbosch, North Brabant
Demet Sari, 26, from Amsterdam, North Holland
Daisy Smid, 18, from Sneek, Friesland
Elli Palimeris, 21, from IJmuiden, North Holland
Lara Massen, 19, from Geleen, Limburg (runner-up)
Anna Jonckers, 21, from Amsterdam, North Holland (winner)

Summaries

Call-out order

 The contestant won the reward challenge
 The contestant won the additional prize of the reward challenge
 The contestant was eliminated
 The contestant won the competition

In the fifth episode, Daisy & Demet were both eliminated.

Teachers
 Robert Wennekes as butler
 Coco de Meyere as image expert
 Anouk van Eekelen as etiquette expert
 Jacob Jan Boerma as chef
 Coen Winkelman as logopedic

External links
Official page at RTL

Dutch reality television series
2007 Dutch television seasons